The 2014–15 FIS Cross-Country World Cup was the 34th official World Cup season in cross-country skiing for men and women. The season started on 29 November 2014 in Ruka, Finland and ended on 15 March 2015 in Oslo, Norway.

The season's biggest event is FIS Nordic World Ski Championships 2015.

Changed results due to doping violation
On 20 July 2016, Martin Johnsrud Sundby was banned from competing in ski competitions for two months by the FIS after having used an asthma medicine incorrectly during the 2014–15 season. He was also stripped of two results; a victory in 15 km C in Davos, 13 December 2014 and a third place in 25 km F Pursuit in Toblach, 8 January 2015. the latter also resulted in Sundby losing the Tour de Ski title. Due to losing a total of 616 points for the affected competitions he also lost the overall World Cup title.

Calendar

Men

Women

Men's team

Ladies' team

Men's standings

Overall

Distance

Sprint

Prize money

Helvetia U23

Audi Quattro Bonus Ranking

Women's standings

Overall

Distance

Sprint

Prize money

Helvetia U23

Audi Quattro Bonus Ranking

Nations Cup

Overall

Men

Women

Points distribution
The table shows the number of points won in the 2014/15 Cross-Country Skiing World Cup for men and women.

A skier's best results in all distance races and sprint races counts towards the overall World Cup totals.

All distance races, included individual stages in Tour de Ski and in World Cup Final (which counts as 50% of a normal race), count towards the distance standings. All sprint races, including the sprint races during the Tour de Ski and the first race of the World Cup final (which counts as 50% of a normal race), count towards the sprint standings.

In mass start races bonus points are awarded to the first 10 at each bonus station.

The Nations Cup ranking is calculated by adding each country's individual competitors' scores and scores from team events. Relay events count double, with only one team counting towards the total, while in team sprint events two teams contribute towards the total, with the usual World Cup points (100 to winning team, etc.) awarded.

Achievements 
WC stage events are not included. Only individual events.

First World Cup career victory

Men
  Iivo Niskanen, 22, in his 5th season – the WC 2 (15 km C) in Ruka; also first podium
  Didrik Tønseth, 23, in his 4th season – the WC 2 (15 km C Pursuit) in Lillehammer; first podium was 2013–14 WC 4 (15 km C) in Lillehammer
  Finn Hågen Krogh, 24, in his 5th season – the WC 5 (Sprint F) in Davos; first podium was 2012–13 WC 14 (Sprint F) in Lahti
  Federico Pellegrino, 24, in his 6th season – the WC 7 (Sprint F) in Davos; first podium was 2010–11 WC 8 (Sprint F) in Liberec
  Roland Clara, 32, in his 11th season – the WC 8 (9 km F Pursuit) in Val di Fiemme; first podium was 2010–11 WC 7 (9 km F Pursuit) in Val di Fiemme
  Tomas Northug, 24, in his 6th season – the WC 9 (Sprint C) in Otepää; also first podium
  Francesco De Fabiani, 21, in his 2nd season – the WC 16 (15 km C) in Lahti; also first podium
  Sjur Røthe, 26, in his 7th season – the WC 18 (50 km F) in Oslo; first podium was 2012-13 WC 4 (15 km C) in Canmore

Women
  Jennie Öberg, 25, in her 5th season – the WC 11 (Sprint F) in Rybinsk; also first podium
  Martine Ek Hagen, 23, in her 5th season – the WC 12 (Skiathlon) in Rybinsk; also first podium

First World Cup podium

Men
  Sondre Turvoll Fossli, 21, in his 5th season – no. 3 in the WC 1 (Sprint C) in Ruka
  Iivo Niskanen, 22, in his 5th season – no. 1 in the WC 2 (15 km C) in Ruka
  Toni Ketelä, 26, in his 5th season – no. 3 in the WC 9 (Sprint C) in Otepää
  Tomas Northug, 24, in his 6th season – no. 1 in the WC 9 (Sprint C) in Otepää
  Andrey Parfenov, 27, in his 8th season – no. 3 in the WC 11 (Sprint F) in Rybinsk
  Timo André Bakken, 25, in his 8th season – no. 3 in the WC 13 (Sprint C) in Östersund
  Sindre Bjørnestad Skar, 23, in his 5th season – no. 2 in the WC 15 (Sprint F) in Lahti
  Richard Jouve, 20, in his 1st season – no. 3 in the WC 15 (Sprint F) in Lahti
  Francesco De Fabiani, 21, in his 2nd season – no. 1 in the WC 16 (15 km C) in Lahti

Women
  Jennie Öberg, 25, in her 5th season – no. 1 in the WC 11 (Sprint F) in Rybinsk
  Martine Ek Hagen, 23, in her 5th season – no. 1 in the WC 12 (Skiathlon) in Rybinsk

Victories in this World Cup (all-time number of victories as of 2014/15 season in parentheses)

Men
  Petter Northug, 3 (37) first places
  Eirik Brandsdal, 3 (8) first places
  Finn Hågen Krogh, 3 (6) first places
  Federico Pellegrino, 3 (3) first places 
  Dario Cologna, 2 (21) first place
  Martin Johnsrud Sundby, 2 (10) first places
  Didrik Tønseth, 2 (2) first places
  Alexey Poltoranin, 1 (8) first place
  Anders Gløersen, 1 (5) first place
  Maxim Vylegzhanin, 1 (6) first place
  Pål Golberg, 1 (3) first place
  Tim Tscharnke, 1 (2) first place
  Iivo Niskanen, 1 (1) first place
  Tomas Northug, 1 (1) first place
  Francesco De Fabiani, 1 (1) first place
  Sjur Røthe, 1 (1) first place
  Roland Clara, 1 (1) first place

Women
  Marit Bjørgen, 15 (102) first places
  Therese Johaug, 6 (25) first places
  Ingvild Flugstad Østberg, 2 (3) first places
  Charlotte Kalla, 1 (4) first place
  Maiken Caspersen Falla, 1 (4) first place
  Astrid Uhrenholdt Jacobsen, 1 (5) first place
  Jennie Öberg, 1 (1) first place
  Martine Ek Hagen, 1 (1) first place

Retirements 
Following are notable cross-country skiers who announced their retirement:

Men

Women

References 

 
FIS Cross-Country World Cup seasons
2015 in cross-country skiing
2014 in cross-country skiing